Ion Grigorescu (born March 15, 1945 in Bucharest) is a Romanian painter who was one of the first Romanian conceptual artists. 

Grigorescu is the creator of numerous films, photographic series, and actions recorded on film, as well as drawings and collages.  His subjects include both his private life and the passage of the Romanian people from life under communism to capitalism.

Personal exhibitions – selection
2013 – Trauma of the Exposed Body, prometeogallery di Ida Pisani, Church San Matteo, Lucca
2011 – Performing History, the Romanian Pavilion at the 54th International exhibition La Biennale di Venezia
2011 – Rome seen with the eyes / Rome invented, with Bogdan Vladuţă, workshop, Andreiana Mihail Gallery, Bucharest;

 Grigorescu, galeria Mitterand, Zuerich; Horse, Men Market, (personal) Friedrichshof Sammlung; Grigorescu, Enseigne des Oudin, Paris;

2010 – Oedipus The Wanderer, Gregor Podnar gallery, Berlin;
2009 – The Poor people are fending for themselves Angels Gallery, Barcelona;

 In the Body of the Victim, retrospective Modern Art Museum Warsaw; Lili Dujourie and Ion Grigorescu, Ludlow 38, New York;
2008 – Superpositions, Jean-Gabriel Mitterand Gallery, Paris;

 Le Temps a modifié les lieux, Enseigne des Oudin, Paris; Retrospective Ion Grigorescu, Artra Gallery, Milano;

2007 - Ressources, with Geta Brătescu, M.N.A.C. Bucharest
2006 – Am Boden, Salzburg, Kunstverein;
2004 - Fotografii recente, Bucuresti, personal exhibition, Galeria Noua, Bucharest
1998 - National Museum of Art, Kretzulescu hall, Bucharest, personal exhibition
1993 - Mahlzeit für eine tote Kunst, Schauplatz Zeitgenossischer Kunst, Vienna

Group exhibitions
1981 - São Paulo Biennale, Brasil
1990 - Points East, Third's Eye Gallery Glasgow,
1991 - Wanderlieder, Stedelijk Museum Amsterdam
1994 - São Paulo Biennale, Brasil
1997 - Venice Biennale, Romanian Pavilion
1998 - Out of Actions, MOCA Los Angeles, Vienna, Barcelona, Tokyo;

 Body and the East, Moderna Galertja, Ljubljana

2000 - 2000+Collection, Ljublijana,
2001 - Double Life, Generali Foundation Vienna,

 Remedy for Melancholy, Edsvik Art, Sollentuna

2002 - Auf der Suche nach Balkanien, Graz neue Gallerie;

 In den Schluchten des Balkan, Friedericianum Kassel;
2003 - Prophetic Remix, M.N.A.C. Bucharest;

 Prophetic Corners, Iaşi
2004 - Bienala Cetinje, Love It or Leave It;

 Revolutions reloaded, Artra Gallery, Milan; Arteast, Moderna galerija, Ljubljana; Prolog, National Museum Arad, Romania; Formate, Bukarest, Kunsthalle Vienna; M.N.A.C., Bucharest, Vă place palatul Ceauşescu?;

2005 - Lisbon, Gulbenkian Foundation, Paradoxes, Embodying the City;
2006 – Kontakte, colectia Erstebank, MUMOK Vienna;

 Autopoesis, National Gallery Bratislava
2007 – Lund, Kunsthall, Possible in art

 Documenta 12, Kassel Dadaeast, (Zürich, Prague, Stockholm, Sibiu, Warsaw), Exit memory, desire, October, Artra, Milano

2008 – Crisis, galeria Angels Barcelona
2009 – Subversive Practices, Stuttgarter Kunstverein;

 Agents et Provocateurs, Dunaujvaros; Gender Check, Ludwigsmuseum Vienna
2010 – Subversive practices, Trafo, Budapest;

 Promesses du Passe, Centre Pompidou; 4th Biennale Berlin; Bienala Bucurestiului, Bucharest and Stockholm ; Agents and Provocateurs, Hartware Medien Kunstverein, Dortmund; Romanian Art, Leipzig, Spinnerei Frieze Art Fair London
2011 – Out of Place, Tate Modern Gallery, London;

 Desene, Andreiana Mihail Gallery, Bucharest; Venice Biennale, Romanian Pavilion; Ostalgia, New Museum New York;

Awards
1998 - Award for the church restoration painting
1998 - Award of the magazine "Cuvantul"
1993 - Award Andrei Cadere
1978, 1989 - Award of the art critics, Romania
1972 - Youth Award Romanian Union of Artists

Notes

Bibliography
Beeren, Wim in ”Wanderlieder” exhibition catalogue, Stedelijk Museum, Amsterdam, 1991
Stiles, Kristine ”Uncorrupted Joy” in “Out of Action: Between Performance and the Object, 1949–1979” exhibition catalogue, MOCA, Los Angeles, 1998
Pintilie, Ileana ”Actionism in Romania during the Communist Era”, IDEA Publishing House, Cluj, 2002
Kreuger, Anders “There is no transparence or appearance” and Faria, Nuno “Deja-vu. Some notes on Paradoxes: the embodied city” in ”Paradoxes: the Embodied City”, Gulbenkian Foundation, Lisbon, 2005
Saxenhuber, Hedwig ”...that they mark everyday life in its depth”, in Springerin, Band XI, Heft 1 Fruejahr, Vienna, 2005
Cel ce se pedepsește singur. Stefan Bertalan, Florin Mitroi, Ion Grigorescu. Arta și România în anii 80–90, Editura Institutului Cultural Român, 2009
Experiment în arta românească după 1960”- Adrian Guță, Performance art în România între 1980–1996, p. 79, Centrul Soros pentru artă contemporană, 1997
Alexandra Titu, Experimentul în arta românească după 1960,Ion Grigorescu,Editura Meridiane 2003
Ion Grigorescu, Studiul 3, Prolog, Editura Institutului Cultural Român, 2009
Ion Grigorescu, Catalogul Romanian Cultural Resolution, editat de Editura Hatje Cantz, 2011;
Ion Grigorescu, Catalogue de l'exposition „Les Promesses du Passé, Centre Pompidou, 2010;
Ion Grigorescu, exhibition catalog, Ressources, with Geta Brătescu, M.N.A.C. Bucharest, 2007;
Catalogul proiectului Performing History sub forma unui supliment special al numărului 38 al revistei "IDEA artă+societate", 2011
Ion Grigorescu, exhibition catalog The poor people are fending for themselves, Angeles Gallery Barcelona, 2009;
Ion Grigorescu: In the Body of the Victim, author Marta Dziewanska, Museum of Modern Art in Warsaw, 2011

External links
http://www.artnet.com/artists/ion-grigorescu/
http://performinghistory.ro/ion-grigorescu-statement
http://sfere.ro/nsphere/content/2010/06/overlapping-realities-on-the-artistic-practice-of-ion-grigorescu/
http://subversive.c3.hu/en/Ion%20Grigorescu.php
http://www.artmargins.com/index.php/interviews/539-hard-pin-down-ion-grigorescu-interview
http://www.angelsbarcelona.com/artistas/crisi-contra-les-aparences/eng/grigorescu/works.htm
http://www.ludlow38.org/index.php?/upcoming/lili-dujourie-and-ion-grigorescu/
https://web.archive.org/web/20111113121653/http://e-flux.com/shows/view/6333
http://pomeranz-collection.com/?q=node/76

1945 births
Living people
Artists from Bucharest
Romanian painters